Nissly Swiss Chocolate Company is a historic factory complex located at Mount Joy, Lancaster County, Pennsylvania. The complex includes two contributing buildings. They are the three-story, three bay by six bay factory building and the one-story four bay by three bay, "L"-shaped, boiler room building.  The buildings were both built in 1920.  It was used to produce milk chocolates until 1929.

It was listed on the National Register of Historic Places in 1995.

References

Industrial buildings and structures on the National Register of Historic Places in Pennsylvania
Industrial buildings completed in 1920
Buildings and structures in Lancaster County, Pennsylvania
National Register of Historic Places in Lancaster County, Pennsylvania